Colton Thomas Smith (born August 14, 1987) is an American mixed martial artist who formerly competed in the Lightweight division of the Ultimate Fighting Championship. Smith is best known for competing on, and winning The Ultimate Fighter: Team Carwin vs. Team Nelson.

His dominant wrestling style allowed him to defeat all five fighters he faced in the tournament by decision. He is currently an active member of the U.S. Army.

Early life
Smith started wrestling at an early age. During high school, Smith wrestled for Ankeny High School at 145 pounds. Smith graduated high school in 2005.

Army career
Smith, a Combat infantry soldier, earned airborne, ranger, and sapper tabs and has served tours in Iraq, Syria, Jordan and Afghanistan. While assigned to Echo Company, 4th Battalion, 3rd Infantry Regiment (Old Guard), Smith earned his Expert Infantryman Badge. Smith currently serves as the chief Combatives Instructor at III Corps and Fort Hood. Smith has since been selected for promotion to Sergeant First Class and expects to refocus on Army training. The Army Times admitted, after criticizing Smith's recent MMA performances, that they received backlash from their vocal readership indicating Smith's popularity among fellow servicemembers.

Mixed martial arts career

Early career
Smith started his career with a 2–1 record, including a win in M-1 Challenge. Smith trained Brazilian Jiujitsu under Relson Gracie earning his purple belt and developed his MMA skill under Lloyd Irvin and Vanguard Gym in Manassas, Virginia.

The Ultimate Fighter
Smith was selected as a cast member for The Ultimate Fighter: Team Carwin vs. Team Nelson. He had to receive special permission in order to participate in the reality series during active duty. In the elimination fight in order to get into the house, Smith defeated Jesse Barrett by unanimous decision. Smith was the subject of controversy for putting his hand out to touch gloves, but faking and immediately shooting for a take down.

In his first fight inside the house, Smith won a majority decision over Eddie Ellis.

In the quarterfinal round Smith won another decision over Igor Araujo to advance to the semifinal round.

In the semifinals, Smith advanced to the finals with a unanimous decision win over Jon Manley.

Ultimate Fighting Championship
Smith made his official UFC debut on December 15, 2012 at The Ultimate Fighter: Team Carwin vs. Team Nelson Finale against Mike Ricci. Smith won the fight via unanimous decision to become the Ultimate Fighter 16 winner.

Smith faced Robert Whittaker on May 25, 2013 at UFC 160. He lost the fight by TKO in the third round.

Smith next faced Michael Chiesa in a lightweight bout on November 6, 2013 at UFC Fight Night 31. He was defeated via rear naked choke in the second round.

Smith faced promotional newcomer Carlos Diego Ferreira on June 28, 2014 at UFC Fight Night: Swanson vs. Stephens. He lost the fight via a modified rear-naked choke submission, and was released from the promotion shortly after.

Post-UFC
Eight months after his last UFC fight, Smith returned to compete on the local circuit where he picked up two victories in the Rocks Xtreme MMA promotion.

World Series of Fighting
On August 20, 2015 it was announced that Smith signed with the World Series of Fighting.  He made his eventual debut on October 17, 2015 at WSOF 24 against Washington Da Silva. He won the fight via unanimous decision.

Grappling
On July 22, 2013, Colton Smith competed in a no gi super fight against Carlos Diego Ferreira at the American Grappling Federation's Southern Regionals. Ferreira won the match by points.

Personal life
Smith has three children. He runs his own MMA gym, Enlisted Nine Fight Company, in Stafford County, Virginia and fledging lifestyle brand Enlisted Nine Fight Company partnered with Veteran Clothing giant, NineLine Apparel.

Accomplishments
Ultimate Fighting Championship
 Ultimate Fighter 16 Winner
The Ultimate Fighter 16 Fight of the Season

Mixed martial arts record

|-
| Loss
| align=center| 7–5
| Sean Brady
| Decision (unanimous)
| Shogun Fights: Florida
| 
| align=center| 3
| align=center| 5:00
| Hollywood, Florida, United States
|
|-
| Win
| align=center| 7–4
| Joseph Valadez
| Decision (unanimous)
| OCFN: Honoring America's Warriors
| 
| align=center| 3
| align=center| 5:00
| Weatherford, Oklahoma, United States
|
|-
| Win
| align=center| 6–4
| Washington Da Silva
| Decision (unanimous)
| WSOF 24
| 
| align=center| 3
| align=center| 5:00
| Mashantucket, Connecticut, United States
| 
|-
| Win 
| align=center| 5–4
| Marcus Andrusla
| TKO (punches)  
| Rocks Xtreme MMA 14
| 
| align=center| 1
| align=center| 2:35
| Harker Heights, Texas, United States
| 
|-
| Win
| align=center| 4–4
| Evan Cutts
| Decision (unanimous)
| Rocks Xtreme MMA 12
| 
| align=center| 3
| align=center| 5:00
| Harker Heights, Texas, United States
| 
|-
| Loss
| align=center| 3–4
| Carlos Diego Ferreira
| Submission (rear-naked choke)
| UFC Fight Night: Swanson vs. Stephens
| 
| align=center| 1
| align=center| 0:38
| San Antonio, Texas, United States
| 
|-
| Loss
| align=center| 3–3
| Michael Chiesa
| Submission (rear-naked choke)
| UFC: Fight for the Troops 3
| 
| align=center| 2
| align=center| 1:41
| Fort Campbell, Kentucky, United States
| 
|-
| Loss
| align=center| 3–2
| Robert Whittaker
| TKO (punches)
| UFC 160
| 
| align=center| 3
| align=center| 0:41
| Las Vegas, Nevada, United States
| 
|-
| Win
| align=center| 3–1
| Mike Ricci
| Decision (unanimous)
| The Ultimate Fighter 16 Finale
| 
| align=center| 3
| align=center| 5:00
| Las Vegas, Nevada, United States
| 
|-
| Loss
| align=center| 2–1
| Steve Montgomery
| KO (punch)
| Championship Fighting Alliance 5
| 
| align=center| 2
| align=center| 0:08
| Coral Gables, Florida, United States
| 
|-
| Win
| align=center| 2–0
| Walter Coles
| TKO (submission to punches)
| Demolition Combat 
| 
| align=center| 1
| align=center| 1:52
| Winchester, Virginia, United States
| 
|-
| Win
| align=center| 1–0
| Brian Nielson
| Submission (rear-naked choke)
| M-1 Challenge 24: Damkovsky vs. Figueroa
| 
| align=center| 1
| align=center| 4:19
| Norfolk, Virginia, United States
|

Mixed martial arts exhibition record

|-
| Win
| align=center| 4–0
| Jon Manley
| Decision (unanimous)
| The Ultimate Fighter: Team Carwin vs. Team Nelson
| 
| align=center| 3
| align=center| 5:00
| Las Vegas, Nevada, United States
| 
|-
| Win
| align=center| 3–0
| Igor Araujo
| Decision (unanimous)
| The Ultimate Fighter: Team Carwin vs. Team Nelson
| 
| align=center| 2
| align=center| 5:00
| Las Vegas, Nevada, United States
| 
|-
| Win
| align=center| 2–0
| Eddy Ellis
| Decision (Majority) 
| The Ultimate Fighter: Team Carwin vs. Team Nelson
| 
| align=center| 2
| align=center| 5:00
| Las Vegas, Nevada, United States
| 
|-
| Win
| align=center| 1–0
| Jesse Barrett 
| Decision (unanimous)
| The Ultimate Fighter: Team Carwin vs. Team Nelson
| 
| align=center| 2
| align=center| 5:00
| Las Vegas, Nevada, United States
|

Amateur mixed martial arts record

|Win
|align=center| 5–1
|Gary Wilkins
|TKO (punches)
|Barbarian Fight Club - 2011 Matinee
|
|align=center|1
|align=center|1:57
|Fredericksburg, Virginia, United States
|
|-
|Loss
|align=center| 4–1
|Chad Malone
|Decision (split)
|Operation Octagon 11
|
|align=center|3
|align=center|5:00
|Sterling, Virginia, United States
|
|-
|Win
|align=center| 4–0
|William Bookwalter
|Submission (rear-naked choke)
|Operation Octagon 9
|
|align=center|1
|align=center|4:29
|Sterling, Virginia, United States
|
|-
|Win
|align=center| 3–0
|Jarreau Mobley
|Submission (rear-naked choke)
|Operation Octagon 8
|
|align=center|1
|align=center|1:33
|Manassas, Virginia, United States
|
|-
|Win
|align=center| 2–0
|Cody Toy
|Submission (anaconda choke)
|Operation Octagon 5
|
|align=center|1
|align=center|2:42
|Manassas, Virginia, United States
|
|-
|Win
|align=center| 1–0
|Rob Wine
|TKO (punches)
|Gladiator Fight Club 2 - Call to Glory
|
|align=center|1
|align=center|0:52
|Winchester, Virginia, United States
|
|}

References

External links
 
 

1987 births
Living people
United States Army Rangers
Sportspeople from Des Moines, Iowa
Lightweight mixed martial artists
Welterweight mixed martial artists
Mixed martial artists utilizing wrestling
Mixed martial artists utilizing Brazilian jiu-jitsu
American practitioners of Brazilian jiu-jitsu
People awarded a black belt in Brazilian jiu-jitsu
Mixed martial artists from Iowa
People from Fort Hood, Texas
Ultimate Fighting Championship male fighters